The ABC Murders is a 2018 BBC One mystery  thriller television serial loosely based on Agatha Christie's 1936  novel of the same name. It was broadcast over three consecutive nights beginning on 26 December 2018. It was adapted by Sarah Phelps and directed by Alex Gabassi. It stars John Malkovich as Hercule Poirot, with Rupert Grint, Andrew Buchan, Tara Fitzgerald and Shirley Henderson in supporting roles.

The series was released on DVD through Universal Pictures UK on 11 March 2019.

Cast

Main
 John Malkovich as Hercule Poirot
 Rupert Grint as Inspector Crome
 Andrew Buchan as Franklin Clarke
 Eamon Farren as Alexander Bonaparte Cust
 Jack Farthing as Donald Fraser
 Gregor Fisher as Dexter Dooley
 Tara Fitzgerald as Lady Hermione Clarke
 Henry Goodman as Sidney Prynne
 Shirley Henderson as Rose Marbury
 Bronwyn James as Megan Barnard
 Freya Mavor as Thora Grey
 Kevin McNally as Inspector Japp
 Michael Shaeffer as Sergeant Yelland

Supporting

Production

Locations 
Various cities, towns and villages in the historic county of Yorkshire in the north of England—including Grosmont, Leeds, Pickering, Ripon, Saltaire, Skelton-on-Ure and Wakefield—played key roles as settings for this adaptation.  Newby Hall in North Yorkshire is the mansion at Churston. The De La Warr Pavilion at Bexhill-on-Sea in East Sussex is also featured.

Episodes

Reception
The review aggregator Rotten Tomatoes gave the series an approval rating of 70% based on 30 reviews, The website's critical consensus reads, "The ABC Murders liberally adapts the famed Agatha Christie mystery while retaining its thrilling spirit, thanks in part to the sly performance of John Malkovich, who inhabits Hercule Poirot with enough wizened panache to win over those who were skeptical of his casting. " On Metacritic, the film holds a weighted average score of 58 out of 100, based on 10 critics, indicating "mixed or average" reviews.

The Guardian gave the first episode four stars and praised Malkovich's performance. The Times gave it four stars and found it enjoyable, also praising Malkovich. Reviewing the finale, Metro praised Poirot's new backstory and declared it "mystery television at its finest".

References

External links
 

 

2010s British television miniseries
2018 British television series debuts
2018 British television series endings
2010s British drama television series
2010s British crime television series
2010s British mystery television series
English-language television shows
Television series set in the 1930s
Television shows set in the United Kingdom
Television shows set in London
Television shows set in Hampshire
Television shows set in East Sussex
Television shows set in Devon
Television shows set in South Yorkshire
Television shows based on works by Agatha Christie
BBC television dramas
Television series by Mammoth Screen
Television series set in 1933